Napoleon Sarony (March 9, 1821 – November 9, 1896) was an American lithographer and photographer. He was a highly popular portrait photographer, best known for his portraits of the stars of late-19th-century American theater. His son, Otto Sarony, continued the family business as a theater and film star photographer.

Life
Sarony was born in 1821 in Quebec, then in the British colony of Lower Canada, and moved to New York City around 1836. He worked as an illustrator for Currier and Ives before joining with James Major and starting his own lithography business, Sarony & Major, in 1843. In 1845, James Major was replaced in Sarony & Major by Henry B. Major, and the firm continued operating under that name until 1853. From 1853 to 1857, the firm was known as Sarony and Company, and from 1857 to 1867, as Sarony, Major & Knapp. Sarony left the firm in 1867 and established a photography studio at 37 Union Square, during a time when celebrity portraiture was a popular fad. Photographers would pay their famous subjects to sit for them, and then retain full rights to sell the pictures. Sarony reportedly paid the internationally famous stage actress Sarah Bernhardt $1,500 to pose for his camera, . In 1894, he published a portfolio of prints entitled "Sarony's Living Pictures".

Associations
Included among the thousands of people that came into Sarony's world were many distinguished people, such as American Civil War General William T. Sherman and literary figures Samuel Clemens (Mark Twain), Lew Wallace and Oscar Wilde. Sarony also took a photograph of the great American inventor Nikola Tesla that was later engraved by T. Johnson.

William T. Sherman

In 1888, Sarony photographed William T. Sherman, three years before he died in 1891. Sarony's photograph would be used as a model for the engraving of the first Sherman Postage stamp.

Samuel Clemens; the Lotos, Salmagundi and Tile Clubs
Sarony took numerous photographs of Samuel Clemens (Mark Twain). Clemens and Sarony were in the same social circles and shared many mutual acquaintances. They both belonged to the Lotos Club in New York City. Sarony helped in the founding of the Salmagundi Club, an association of artists, and was also a member of the Tile Club, whose members included well-known authors and journalists. In 1883, English author Wilkie Collins dedicated his anti-vivisection book Heart and Science to Sarony. In 1884, Sarony was a participant in an April Fool's joke played on Clemens when George Washington Cable arranged for 150 of Clemens's friends to write to him simultaneously, requesting his autograph. As part of the joke, no stamps or envelopes were to be provided for a reply.

Oscar Wilde

One of Sarony's portraits of writer Oscar Wilde became the subject of a U.S. Supreme Court case, Burrow-Giles Lithographic Co. v. Sarony 111 U.S. 53 (1884), in which the Court upheld the extension of copyright protection to photographs. Sarony sued Burrow-Giles after it used unauthorized lithographs of Oscar Wilde No. 18 in an advertisement, and won a judgment for $610 (the modern equivalent of just over $12,000) that was affirmed on appeal by the Second Circuit Court of Appeals and the Supreme Court. Sarony later photographed the Supreme Court itself, to celebrate the centennial of the federal judiciary in 1890.

Family
Sarony was married twice. His first wife died in 1858; his second, Louie, reportedly shared his tendency towards eccentricity and preference for outlandish dress. She rented elaborate costumes that she wore during her daily afternoon walk through Washington Square, wearing them once before returning them.

His brother, Oliver François Xavier Sarony (1820–1879), was also a portrait photographer, working primarily in England,  who died in 1879. Napoleon's son, Otto (1850–1903), continued the family name for a few years until his own death in 1903.

Sarony was buried in Green-Wood Cemetery in Brooklyn.

See also
 Mathew Brady
 Alfred Cheney Johnston

Gallery

References

External links
 A Biographical Chronology for Napoleon Sarony
 Article and rare pictures of Napoleon Sarony and his subject Mark Twain
 Portrait of Oliver Sarony (1820-1879)
 The Sarony Photographs of Oscar Wilde (complete)

American portrait photographers
19th-century American printmakers
Pre-Confederation Canadian emigrants to the United States
1821 births
1896 deaths
Burials at Green-Wood Cemetery
American lithographers
19th-century American photographers
19th-century lithographers
19th-century male artists